Associazione Calcio Nilam Muara Badak, commonly known as simply ACN Muara Badak, is a Indonesia association football club based in Kutai Kartanegara Regency, East Kalimantan. The football club currently plays in Liga 3 which is the last tier in Indonesian football.

History
ACN Muara Badak was established on 1982 by employees of the oil and gas company, PT Pertamina Hulu Sanga Sanga at Nilam Field, which was inspired by the Italian Serie A club, AC Milan.

When it was first founded, the club was named AC Nilam Hanter, then on 28 October 2018, officially became a Liga 3 club affiliated with Association Provincial PSSI of East Kalimantan (Asprov PSSI Kalimantan Timur) and officially rename to ACN Muara Badak.

References

External links
Associazione Calcio Nilam Muara Badak Instagram
 

Kutai Kartanegara Regency
Football clubs in Indonesia
Football clubs in East Kalimantan
Association football clubs established in 1982
1982 establishments in Indonesia